The Ostrava tramway network is the third largest tram network in the Czech Republic. The network is operated by Dopravní podnik Ostrava, a company wholly owned by the city of Ostrava that also runs the city's bus and trolleybus network. The network is a part of ODIS, the integrated public transport system of the Moravian-Silesian Region.

Most of the network is double-track and is confined to the boundaries of the city; the only exception to both is Line 5 between Poruba and Budišovice, which runs on a single-track section with two sidings. It is one out of two remaining single-track tram lines in the Czech Republic that is in regular operation, the other is the interurban line between Liberec and Jablonec nad Nisou.

History

The first tram engine line that ran between Přívoz and Vítkovice was opened on 18 August 1894 by Brünner Local-Eisenbahn-Gesellschaft (BLEG). The network was first extended two years later, when a branch leading to the Reichsbrücke (modern day Miloš Sýkora Bridge) opened. Eventually, a new line to Hulváky opened in 1899. At this point, trams were running every 20 minutes and the network was used for over a million trips. Neglected maintenance and increased operating costs of tram engines led BLEG to reduce its rolling stock from 16 to 9 engines and to adjust the interval to 30 minutes.

The network was electrified at the turn of the 20th century and regular electric tram service started on 5 April 1901, although tram engines continued to be used for freight until 1922. The network further expanded in the following years, adding two new lines in 1907: Hulváky-Svinov and Mariánské Hory-Vítkovice. A second rail was also added to busier sections of existing lines. In 1920, BLEG changed name to Společnost moravských místních drah (SMMD) and moved its headquarters to Moravská Ostrava.

Post-World War II
Post-World War II, with the industry of the city growing, authorities also developed the public transportation, which included tramways. The main extensions of the system were from the city centre to industrial and residential areas in the south. In 1950s and 60s, the city started operating the larger Tatra T2 and Tatra T3 trams. Around the same time, it was decided that trams should be the main public transport in the city, as the system was open to be modernised later and could carry a lot of passengers. In the early 1960s, tramlines were added to new urban areas in the south, as they weren't connected to railway. Further expansions were aimed at improving connections between new urban areas and industrial areas rather than the city centre. Trams were used to connect Poruba, which had only one route and thus was prone traffic congestion, to the rest of the city.

21st century
The nine Inekon 01 Trio cars date from 2002 to 2004. Since 2005, low-floor new-builds of T3 trams VarioLF have also been in operation, which are being used for the renewal of the fleet. Some line sections have also been reconstructed and a new transport terminal at Hranečník was opened in August 2015.

Between 2003 and 2011, the two-way KT8D5 trams were reconstructed to the new one-way type KT8D5R.N1 with a medium low-floor section.

In May 2018, new Tango NF2 trams from the Swiss company Stadler Rail were delivered to Ostrava. These are medium-capacity cars, of which there will be 40 in total. The vehicles now have full-carriage air conditioning.

In 2018, the paintwork of public transport and service vehicles was changed. The new corporate livery is light blue to turquoise. The color is complemented by a silver stripe under the windows and black window frames. The new paint will be given to new Stadler cars and cars that will be on the grand tour.

In July and August 2020, the speed was increased to 80 km/h between the Třebovice OC and Nová Ves vodárna stops. In March 2021 there was also a speed increase between the Hranečník interchange and the Zárubek mine. In October of the same year, the speed was also increased on the line along Místecká from the Dolní Vítkovice stop to the Jeremenko Colony. In early October 2021, the first Škoda 39T car was delivered. At the end of 2022, the last Tatra T3 cars with the original resistance equipment with accelerator arrived.

Routes
As of 2023, 17 routes are operated on Ostrava tramway's network:

 day services – in operation between 04:00 and 23:00
 day & night services – in operation continuously
 night services – in operation from 23:00 until 04:00 the following day

Rolling stock
In December 2017, 260 trams intended for passenger transport were in operation in Ostrava:

See also
 History of Ostrava
 List of tram and light rail transit systems 
 List of town tramway systems in the Czech Republic

References

Citations

Bibliography

External links
Official website of Dopravní podnik Ostrava

Ostrava
Ostrava
Transport in Ostrava